Otites formosa is a species of ulidiid or picture-winged fly in the genus Otites of the family Ulidiidae.

Description
The head is orange-red and the large compound eyes are reddish. Mesonotum shows four longitudinal black stripes, while the abdomen has three large transversal black stripes. The wings are decorated with distinctive dark drawings. Adults feed on flowers, specially Apiaceae, while the larvae feed on plants, litter or faeces.

Distribution
This species is present in Albania, Belgium, Bulgaria, Croatia, Czech Republic, France, Germany, Greece, Hungary, Italy, Poland, Romania, Russia, eastern Palearctic realm, and in the Near East.

References
Fauna Europaea
Biolib
Ubio.org
European Environment Agency

External links
Animateur.nature
Aramel.free

formosa
Diptera of Europe
Insects described in 1798